The Maesteg Line is a commuter rail line in South Wales from Bridgend to Maesteg. Services usually operate from Maesteg to  via the South Wales Main Line and Gloucester to Newport Line.

Electrification by 2019 was announced in the Department for Transport's High Level Output Specification of 2012.

History
The Llynfi and Ogmore Railway (L&OVR) was formed on 28 June 1866 (itself the amalgamation of earlier lines); a standard gauge line as opposed to the main line. On 1 July 1873 the GWR took over the L&OVR.

The line from Bridgend originally operated beyond Maesteg through Caerau and the Cymmer Tunnel, known locally as the 'Gwdihw', to passenger stations in Cymmer, known as Cymmer General and further to Abergwynfi. The lines also connected collieries in Abergwynfi and Glyncorrwg. Junctions at both Tondu and Cymmer connected with east–west routes across the Llynfi and Afan valleys.

The Maesteg branch was closed to passenger trains in 1970 (though it remained in use for coal traffic until 1988), and the link with the Afan Valley was lost due to the closure of the Cymmer Tunnel.

A long campaign in the late 1980s and early 90s, resulted in the reopening of the line in 1992 as far as Maesteg by British Rail and Mid Glamorgan County Council. The new stations and line were officially opened by Prince Richard, Duke of Gloucester and a plaque was unveiled at Maesteg station.

The railway north of Maesteg continued to exist until 2004, however it was removed as part of the Maesteg Washery reclamation scheme. The track to the north of Llynfi North Junction, including the former Nantyffyllon and Caerau stations, have been part of a major housing developments. Reconnection with Cymmer (Afan Valley) is financially unviable to reinstate;– the tunnel portal is still visible at the Caerau end but it is completely buried at the Cymmer end.

Today the line is operated by Transport for Wales Rail on services from Cheltenham Spa to Maesteg via Cardiff Central and Bridgend, and repeated from Maesteg to Cheltenham Spa, as part of the Valley Lines network. TfW Rail replaced the previous franchises, Arriva Trains Wales who ran the service December 2003-October 2018 and Wales & Borders in December 2003.

References

 Historical notes are taken from The Railway Magazine July 1955, pp 445–454

External links

Railway lines in Wales
Rail transport in Bridgend County Borough